Witchouse is a 1999 supernatural horror film directed by David DeCoteau, credited as Jack Reed, and stars Matt Raftery, Monica Serene Garnich, Ariauna Albright, Brooke Mueller, Ashley McKinney, Dave Oren Ward, and Dane Northcutt. It was released by Full Moon Features. The film has received mainly negative reviews.  The independent film was followed by two sequels, Witchouse 2: Blood Coven and Witchouse 3: Demon Fire. The film is dedicated to Dave Oren Ward who was murdered in Los Angeles on April 7, 1999.

Synopsis
On May Day 1998, in Dunwich, Massachusetts, Elizabeth gathers together a group of specially selected friends for a rather odd party. It turns out that she is the descendant of a malevolent witch named Lilith who was burned at the stake precisely three hundred years ago. Now Elizabeth hopes to resurrect her dreadful ancestor and has a specific (and murderous) need for the guests she has chosen.

Cast
 Ariauna Albright as Lilith LaFey 
 Matt Raftery as Jack Smith
 Monica Serene Garnich as Jennifer 
 Ashley McKinney as Elizabeth LaFey
 Brooke Mueller as Janet
 Dave Oren Ward as Tony 
 Dane Northcutt as Scott
 Marissa Tait as Maria
 Ryan Scott Greene as Brad
 Jason Faunt as Bob
 Kimberly Pullis as Margaret
 Roy Dallas as Kit

Production

Development
Neal Marshall Stevens wrote the original script under the pseudonym Benjamin Carr for Full Moon Entertainment. The studio rejected Stevens' screenplay in favor for a film more akin to Night of the Demons, but would later repurpose it for the 2001 film Stitches.

Filming
Production began in Romania with David Decoteau serving as director.

Release
Witchouse was released on June 22, 1999 by Full Moon Entertainment.

Home Media
The studio released the film on DVD on July 28, 1999.

Reception
On review aggregator Rotten Tomatoes, Witchouse has one negative review.

References

External links 
 
  
 

1999 films
1999 horror films
Films directed by David DeCoteau
Films about witchcraft
American ghost films
American supernatural horror films
American films about revenge
Full Moon Features films
Films set in 1998
Films set in Massachusetts
American exploitation films
1990s English-language films
1990s American films